Milanoa is a town and commune in northern Madagascar. It belongs to the district of Vohemar, which is a part of Sava Region. The population of the commune was estimated to be approximately 17,000 in 2001 commune census.

Education
Primary and junior level secondary education are available.

Farming
The majority 99% of the population of the commune are farmers, while an additional 0.5% receives their livelihood from raising livestock. The most important crops are rice and vanilla, while other important agricultural products are sugarcane and beans.  Services provide employment for 0.5% of the population.

References and notes 

Populated places in Sava Region